Black Harvest may refer to:
 Black Harvest (1993 film), a Danish drama film 
 Black Harvest (1992 film), an Australian-Papua New Guinea documentary film